A self-portrait is a picture made by the person that it depicts.

Self Portrait or Self-Portrait may also refer to:

Visual arts

Self-Portrait (Beccafumi)
 Self-Portrait (Giovanni Bellini)
 Self-Portrait (Paul Bril)
 Self-portrait (Chassériau)
 Self-portrait (David)
 Self-Portrait (Dou, New York)
 Self-Portrait (Dürer, Madrid)
 Self-Portrait (Dürer, Munich)
 Self-portrait (Thomas Eakins)
 Self-Portrait (Frick, Rembrandt)
 Self-Portrait (Artemisia Gentileschi)
 Self-portrait (Giorgione)
 Self-Portrait (El Greco)
 Self-portrait (Hans Holbein the Younger)
 Self-Portrait (Jordaens)
 Self Portrait (Kramskoi)
 Self-Portrait (Lampi)
 Self-portrait by Judith Leyster
 Self-portrait (Raphael)
 Self-Portrait (Rembrandt, Altman)
 Self-Portrait (Rembrandt, Florence)
 Self-portrait (Rembrandt, Indianapolis)
 Self-Portrait (Rembrandt, Wallace Collection, London)
 Self-Portrait (Rembrandt, Louvre)
 Self-Portrait (Rembrandt, Vienna)
 Self-Portrait (Rubens, Antwerp)
 Self-Portrait (Rubens, London)
 Self-portrait (Tartaglia)
 Self Portrait (Tintoretto)
 Self-Portrait (Titian, Berlin)
 Self-Portrait (Titian, Madrid)
 Self-portrait (van Dyck, 1613-14)
 Self-portrait (van Dyck, 1640)
 Self-Portrait (van Hemessen)
 Self-Portrait (Simon Vouet)

Music
Self Portrait (Ruth Copeland album) (1970)
Self Portrait (Bob Dylan album) (1970)
Self Portrait (Lalah Hathaway album) (2008)
Self Portrait (Hitomi album) (2002)
Self-Portrait (Jay-Jay Johanson album) (2008)
Self Portrait (Raymond Lam album) (2012)
Self Portrait (Junko Onishi album) (1998)
Self Portrait (Loma Prieta album) (2015)
"Self Portrait", a 1975 song by Rainbow from Ritchie Blackmore's Rainbow
Self-Portrait (Suho Album) (2020)

Other uses
Self-Portrait (film), a 1969 film by Yoko Ono
Self Portrait, an autobiography by Che Guevara
Self-Portrait (book), a 2019 book by Celia Paul

See also

Selfie